Yale University was founded in 1701 as a school for Congregationalist ministers. One of its ten founding ministers, Abraham Pierson, became its first Rector, the administrative and ecclesiastical head of the college. After Pierson, four more ministers served as rectors of the collegiate school, until 1745 when Yale College was chartered by the Colony of Connecticut and Thomas Clap's title was changed to president. In 1878, Yale incorporated as a university, and incumbent Timothy Dwight V became the last president of the college and the first of Yale University. The first president not ordained as a minister was Arthur Twining Hadley, inaugurated in 1899; no ordained person has held the office since.

The president is elected by the Yale Corporation, the governing body of the University on which the president sits ex-officio. The corporation's bylaws state that the president is "chief executive officer of the University and as such is responsible for the general direction of all its affairs." The president nominates other university officers, including the provost, secretary, and other vice presidents, for election by the corporation. Other top-level administrative positions, such as university chaplain, deans of schools, and masters of residential colleges, are appointed by the president alone.

The university's current president is Peter Salovey, a professor of social psychology who formerly served as University Provost and Dean of Yale College and received his Ph.D. from Yale's Graduate School of Arts and Sciences.

The Office of the President is located in Woodbridge Hall, a 1901 building erected specifically for administrative purpose. The university maintains an official home for the president on Hillhouse Avenue, which hosts presidential events. Peter Salovey, inaugurated in 2013, is the first president since 1986 to use the home as his primary residence.

Rectors of Yale College (1701–)

Presidents of Yale College (1740–1878) and Yale University (1878–)

References

Yale University
Yale University-related lists